Time and Relative is an original novella written by Kim Newman and based on the long-running British science fiction television series Doctor Who. Set shortly before the first televised Doctor Who story, it features the First Doctor and Susan; their adversary is an entity known as The Cold, which is responsible for the so-called Big Freeze, an unusually harsh winter which caused widespread disruption in the UK. It was released both as a standard edition hardback and a deluxe edition featuring a frontispiece by Bryan Talbot. Both editions have a foreword by Justin Richards.

External links
The Cloister Library - Time and Relative

2001 British novels
2001 science fiction novels
Doctor Who novellas
British science fiction novels
Novels by Kim Newman
First Doctor novels
Telos Publishing books